Christine M. Rose (born Christine M. Weisheit, November 12, 1969 in Parma, Ohio) is a contemporary American author and freelance writer best known for the Rowan of the Wood fantasy series and several works of fiction in the Steampunk genre under pen name O. M. Grey.

Writing and Film Career
Rowan of the Wood, Rose's debut novel, won the 2009 National Indie Excellence Award  for young adult fiction and received positive reviews from various publications, including Austin Monthly Magazine, Front Street Reviews, Teens Read Too, and the MidWest Book Review. 

It was the first in a five-book series of fantasy novels co-written by Rose and her former husband. The storyline revolves around Cullen Knight, an introverted 12-year-old whose mind becomes infused with that of the titular Druid Rowan when Cullen picks up Rowan's wand. Sharing one body, they embark on a quest steeped in Celtic mythology to reunite Rowan with his long lost wife, Fiana. In 2021, Rose produced a podcast narrating the initial book in Rowan's Story. 

Rose's alternate identity, O. M. Grey, emerged in 2010 as a penname for writing paranormal romance. She published under both names simultaneously until 2013, the year the final book in the Rowan of the Wood series was released. 

Avalon Revisited, a steampunk novel by O. M. Grey, became a bestseller of the Gothic romance genre on Amazon.com. It received critical acclaim from fans of the steampunk genre, winning The Steampunk Chronicle's 2012 Reader's Choice Award for Best Fiction. O. M. Grey also published several short stories. Her works include "Dead Mule Crossing," in a Pill Hill Press anthology; "Twenty Minutes," in an SNM Horror Anthology; and "Dust on the Davenport", a story included in a podcast anthology with veteran podcasters and authors Tee Morris and Philippa Ballantine.

O. M. Grey's work gained a considerable following, and she was acknowledged by various conventions. In 2011 Grey appeared as a guest of honor at the Wild Wild West Steampunk Convention in Tucson, Arizona alongside acclaimed author Cherie Priest. She was also honored at the 2011 Steampunk World's Fair in Somerset, New Jersey, and at Aetherfest in San Antonio in both 2011 and 2012. 

She contributed freelance work to several publications, including "MovieMaker Magazine " and on "CommonDreams". She has also shared her insights into social networking, creative writing, the publishing industry, and marketing for authors on the (now defunct) Best Damn Creative Writing Blog.

Eventually, she compiled her networking and publishing experience into a nonfiction book titled Publishing & Marketing Realities for the Emerging Author, which became an Amazon.com bestseller.

As a filmmaker, Rose wrote, directed, and produced a political documentary called "Liberty Bound", which premiered in Paris, France, at a theatre in Place Saint-Michel in 2004. Her second film, "Internationally Speaking", voiced opinions on American foreign policy from around the globe, and included an appearance by Noam Chomsky. Her film credits are listed on IMDb.

Personal life 
Rose keeps a blog  where she has alluded to a future memoir titled One Reason to Live.  She resides in Portland, Oregon.

Selected works

Rowan of the Wood series
Rowan of the Wood (Blue Moose Press)  (2008)
Witch on the Water (Blue Moose Press)  (2009)
Fire of the Fey (Blue Moose Press)  (2010)
Power of the Zephyr (Blue Moose Press)  (2012)
Spirit of the Otherworld (Blue Moose Press)  (2014)

Novels as O.M. Grey
Avalon Revisited (Blue Moose Press)  (2010)
The Zombies of Mesmer (Blue Moose Press)  (2011) 
Caught in the Cogs: An Eclectic Collection (Blue Moose Press)  (2011)
Avalon Revisited (Riverdale Ave Books)  (2013) 
Avalon Revamped (Blue Moose Press)  (2013)
The Ghost of Southwark (Blue Moose Press)  (2013)

Nonfiction
"Publishing & Marketing Realities for the Emerging Author" (Blue Moose Press)  (2011)

Short fiction as O. M. Grey
"Dust on the Davenport" (2011) Podcast. Tales from the Archives. Episode Two.
"Dead Mule Crossing" (2011) in How the West Was Wicked Anthology. (Pill Hill Press) ; eSteampunk eZine, October 2012
"Of Aether and Aeon" (2011) in Steampunk Adventures Magazine, June/July 2011; Gearhearts Steampunk Revue, July 2012
"Twenty Minutes" (2011) in SNM Horror Magazine, July 2011; Bonded By Blood IV (SNM Horror) 
"The Tragic Tale of Doctor Fausset" (2011) in "Stories in the Ether" by Nevermet Press, November 2011
"A Kiss in the Rain" (2013) by Riverdale Ave Books, January 2013; SNM Horror, February 2013
"Final Word" (2013) in "The Rusty Nail," January 2013

Poetry as O. M. Grey
"New York Rain" (2011) in Bar None Group Hall of Fame, October 2011
"If I Had Known..." (2011) in Long Story Short, February 2012
"Look Into My Eyes" (2012) in SNM Horror Magazine, August 2012

References

External links

O.M. Grey official website

1969 births
Living people
21st-century American novelists
American women short story writers
American women novelists
American fantasy writers
American science fiction writers
American women poets
Women science fiction and fantasy writers
Novelists from Ohio
21st-century American women writers
21st-century American poets
21st-century American short story writers